The 1988 African Championships in Athletics were held in Annaba, Algeria, between 29 August and 2 September.

Medal summary

Men's events

Women's events

Medal table

See also
1988 in athletics (track and field)

External links
Results – GBR Athletics

A
African Championships in Athletics
African Championships in Athletics
Annaba
International athletics competitions hosted by Algeria
1988 in Algerian sport